Clifford David Ross (August 3, 1928 – April 12, 1999) was an American professional baseball player: a ,  left-handed pitcher. Born in Philadelphia, Ross played eight seasons of pro baseball between 1947 and 1957 and appeared in four games played for the Cincinnati Redlegs of Major League Baseball at the end of the  season.

Career
Ross was recalled by the Redlegs after completing his most successful minor league season, in which we won 13 of 23 decisions with a 2.91 earned run average for the Class A Schenectady Blue Jays. Pitching in relief, Ross allowed no runs and no hits in his four MLB games, three of them against first division opponents.  He struck out one hitter and — notably for a pitcher who once issued 204 bases on balls in 143 innings pitched in the minors — walked no one. In 2⅔ innings, Ross faced the minimum of eight batsmen and retired them all.  He did not earn a decision, but recorded one save.

Ross was listed on the Redlegs' 1955 spring training roster, but was sent to the minor leagues before the campaign began and never pitched again in the Major Leagues.  As a minor leaguer, he won 45 and lost 69 in 229 appearances.

References

External links

1928 births
1999 deaths
Amarillo Gold Sox players
American expatriate baseball players in Canada
American expatriate baseball players in Mexico
Baseball players from Philadelphia
Cincinnati Redlegs players
Diablos Rojos del México players
Havana Sugar Kings players
Lockport Reds players
Major League Baseball pitchers
Mexican League baseball pitchers
Nashville Vols players
Ogden Reds players
Plainview Ponies players
Sacramento Solons players
San Diego Padres (minor league) players
Schenectady Blue Jays players
Tulsa Oilers (baseball) players
Vancouver Mounties players
American expatriate baseball players in Cuba